The 1951 All-Ireland Senior Hurling Championship Final was the 64th All-Ireland Final and the culmination of the 1951 All-Ireland Senior Hurling Championship, an inter-county hurling tournament for the top teams in Ireland. The match was held at Croke Park, Dublin, on 2 September 1951, between Wexford and Tipperary. The Leinster champions, Wexford, lost to their Munster opponents, Tipperary, on a score line of 7-7 to 3-9.

Match details

All-Ireland Senior Hurling Championship Final
All-Ireland Senior Hurling Championship Final, 1951
All-Ireland Senior Hurling Championship Final
All-Ireland Senior Hurling Championship Finals
Tipperary GAA matches
Wexford GAA matches